Ahmed Hafiane (born 1 October 1966 in Ksour Essef) is a Tunisian actor.

Biography 
A student at the Higher Institute of Dramatic Art in Tunis, he was active in the theater( Caligula) with Hichem Rostom, then in Tunisian cinema.

From 2007, with La giusta distanza by Carlo Mazzacurati, he played in Italian films.

In 2015, Ahmed Hafiane won the Roberto-Rossellini Prize for his role in the third season of the Italian soap opera Una grande famiglia (it), produced by Rai Uno2.

On November 10, 2018, he received the prize for male interpretation of the Carthage Cinematographic Days for his role in Fatwa by Mahmoud Ben Mahmoud.

Filmography 
Sources:

Cinema

Feature films 

 1997: Keswa, the lost thread of Kalthoum Bornaz
 2000: The Season of Men by Moufida Tlatli
 2001: The Desert and the Forest by Gavin Hood (adaptation of the Black Gouffre by Henryk Sienkiewicz): Idrys 
 2002: Clay dolls by Nouri Bouzid
 2002: The Song of the Noria by Abdellatif Ben Ammar
 2002: Fatma by Khaled Ghorbal
 2003: Bedwin Hacker by Nadia El Fani
2004: The Bookstore of Nawfel Saheb-Ettaba
2004: Summer wedding of Mokhtar Ladjimi
2006: Bin El Widyene by Khaled Barsaoui: Ahmed Hafiane
2007: La giusta distanza by Carlo Mazzacurati
2009: La straniera by Marco Turco (it)
2009: La cosa giusta (it) by Marco Campogiani
2010: La nostra vita by Daniele Luchetti
2010: Chronicle of the agony of Aïda Ben Aleya
2010: Scontro di civiltà per un ascensore a Piazza Vittorio by Isotta Toso
2011: Black gold by Jean-Jacques Annaud
2012: Mahmoud's Professor Ben Mahmoud
2013: Ugly, greedy and stupid by Ibrahim Letaïef: Chef Hédi
2014: Tutto molto bello (it) by Paolo Ruffini (it)
2015: Suburra by Stefano Sollima
2016: Aleppo flower by Ridha Behi
2017: El Jaida by Salma Baccar
2018: Fatwa of Mahmoud Ben Mahmoud

Short films 

 2006: Train Train of Taoufik Béhi
 2006: The Rendezvous of Sarra Abidi
 2013: Wooden Hand by Kaouther Ben Hania
 2014: Un giro di valzer by Stefano Garrone
 2015: Il bambino by Silvia Perra
 2016: Mariam de Faiza Ambah
 2018: Watermelons of the Sheikh of Kaouther Ben Hania

Television 

 1995: Al Hasad by Abdelkader Jerbi
 2006: The Gospel of Judas (documentary)
 2009: Aqfas Bila Touyour from Ezzeddine Harbaoui
 2011: L'ombra del destino (it)
 2013: Paura di amare (it)
 2014–2015: Naouret El Hawa by Madih Belaïd
 2015: Una grande famiglia (it)
 2015: Criminal Squadra of Giuseppe Gagliardi (it)
 2016–2017: Flashback by Mourad Ben Cheikh
 2016: Bolice 2.0 by Majdi Smiri
 2018: 4 Blocks
 2019: El Maestro by Lassaad Oueslati
 2022: Harga by Lassaad Oueslati : Lamine

References 

Tunisian male film actors
1966 births
Living people
Tunisian male television actors